Arunus is a genus of beetles in the family Monotomidae, containing the following species:

 Arunus magnus Sen Gupta & Pal, 1995
 Arunus tenuis Sen Gupta & Pal, 1995

References

Monotomidae
Cucujoidea genera